Keskküla may refer to:

Places in Estonia
Keskküla, Lääne County, village in Martna Parish, Lääne County
Keskküla, Rapla County, village in Märjamaa Parish, Rapla County

People
 (1950–2008), Estonian artist

See also
Kesküla

Estonian-language surnames